William Hobbayne or Hobbyns was a resident of Hanwell, Ealing who died in 1484. Upon his death, he bequeathed 22 acres of land and a house valued at £6 per year to be used in benefit for the poor for so-called “goldy purposes”. This donation also helped at the time to educate and clothe twenty-four boys of the parish free of charge at the school of Greenford Magna.  The Charity of William Hobbayne or Hobbayne's Charity then became the most important charity in that parish.

References

1484 establishments in England
Hanwell